Romain Combaud (born 1 April 1991 in Saint-Doulchard) is a French cyclist, who currently rides for UCI WorldTeam .

Major results

2014
 3rd Paris–Mantes-en-Yvelines
 5th Grand Prix des Marbriers
 5th Paris–Troyes
2015
 1st  Mountains classification Tour du Limousin
 4th Tour du Doubs
 5th Overall Boucles de la Mayenne
 6th Polynormande
 8th Classic Sud-Ardèche
 9th Classic Loire Atlantique
2017
 4th Tour de Vendée
 5th Paris–Camembert
 10th Trofeo Laigueglia
2018
 4th Overall Circuit de la Sarthe
 7th Overall Tour du Limousin
 7th Trofeo Laigueglia
2019
 2nd Grand Prix La Marseillaise
 8th Overall Circuit de la Sarthe
2020
 5th Overall Tour du Limousin

Grand Tour general classification results timeline

References

External links

1991 births
Living people
French male cyclists
Sportspeople from Cher (department)